Cerro Armazones is a mountain located in the Sierra Vicuña Mackenna of the Chilean Coast Range, approximately  south-east of Antofagasta in the Antofagasta Region, Chile.
It is located in a privileged zone for optical astronomy because it has 89% cloudless nights a year. It currently hosts the  Hexapod-Telescope and other telescopes at the Cerro Armazones Observatory.

On 26 April 2010, the European Southern Observatory Council selected Cerro Armazones as the site for the planned Extremely Large Telescope, and construction began in June 2014.

Gallery

References

External links
 Bird's view on Cerro Paranal and Cerro Armazones

Landforms of Antofagasta Region
Mountains of Chile
Chilean Coast Range
Articles containing video clips